Pala is a town and a municipality in Kottayam district of Kerala, India. It is the headquarters of the Meenachil taluk and the Pala Revenue Division.

Pala is situated on the banks of the Meenachil river. It is one of the main gateways to the southern high ranges of the Western Ghats.

Demographics 
 Indian census, Pala had a population of 22,640. Males constitute 49% of the population and females 51%. Pala has an average literacy rate of 98%, higher than the national average of 73%: male literacy is 98.5%, and female literacy is 97.8%, still much higher than the state average. 10% of the population is under 6 years of age. Christians make up 65.09% of the population, Hindus 34.19%, Muslims 1.0%, Jain 0.00%, other religions 0.05% and 0.15% not stated.

Cuisine of Pala
Appams, kallappams, or vellayappams are rice flour pancakes that have soft, thick white spongy centres and crisp, lace-like edges.

Beef ularthiyathu is a beef dish cooked with a variety of Indian spices. Other dishes include Peralan (chicken stir-fries), Meat Thoran (dry curry with shredded coconut), sardine and duck curries, and meen molee (spicy stewed fish).

Sports
The Municipal Stadium is the centre of sports in Pala. The multipurpose stadium can be used for conducting athletic events and football. The stadium also has a synthetic track and a football turf. There is also an indoor swimming pool in the sports complex.

The 61st Kerala State Schools Athletics Championships was held at the stadium in 2017. At least 2500 students from 100 schools attended the sports meet. The 63rd Kerala State Athletics Championship was also held at the stadium in the month of October, 2019.

See also 
 Bharananganam
 Cherpunkal
 List of people from Pala
 Meenachil
 Meenachil River
Pala (State Assembly constituency)
Ullanadu

References

External links 

 

 
Articles containing potentially dated statements from 2001
All articles containing potentially dated statements
Cities and towns in Kottayam district
Tourist attractions in Kottayam district